Badumna is a genus of intertidal spiders that was first described by Tamerlan Thorell in 1890. They are harmless spiders that can be found around human structures and buildings. The most well-known species is B. insignis, also known as the "black house spider" or "black window spider".

Description 
They are medium to large cribellate spiders. The carapace is pale brown to a darker brown in color, with long or small brown hairs being found besides smaller white hairs. The opisthosoma has a dark striping or spotting.

Distribution 
Most of the species are considered to be endemic in the Indo-Australian region, but some have been introduced elsewhere. B. longinqua is the only species introduced to North America, now found in urban areas along California's Pacific coast. B. insignis has also been found in Japan, though it is thought it was introduced.

Species
 it contains sixteen species:
Badumna arguta (Simon, 1906) – Australia (Queensland)
Badumna bimetallica (Hogg, 1896) – Central Australia
Badumna exilis Thorell, 1890 – Indonesia (Java)
Badumna exsiccata (Strand, 1913) – Australia
Badumna guttipes (Simon, 1906) – Australia (Victoria, Tasmania)
Badumna hirsuta Thorell, 1890 (type) – Indonesia (Java)
Badumna hygrophila (Simon, 1902) – Australia (Queensland)
Badumna insignis (L. Koch, 1872) – Australia. Introduced to Japan, New Zealand
Badumna longinqua (L. Koch, 1867) – Eastern Australia. Introduced to USA (Coastal Florida and California), Mexico, Uruguay, Japan, New Zealand
Badumna maculata (Rainbow, 1916) – Australia (Queensland)
Badumna microps (Simon, 1908) – Australia (Western Australia)
Badumna pilosa (Hogg, 1900) – Australia (Victoria)
Badumna scalaris (L. Koch, 1872) – Australia (Queensland, central Australia)
Badumna senilella (Strand, 1907) – Australia
Badumna socialis (Rainbow, 1905) – Australia (New South Wales)
Badumna tangae Zhu, Zhang & Yang, 2006 – China

References

External links
Badumna at BugGuide

Araneomorphae genera
Desidae
Taxa named by Tamerlan Thorell